Haiti competed at the 2022 Winter Olympics in Beijing, China, from 4 to 20 February 2022. This marked the country's Winter Olympics debut. Haiti's team consisted of one male alpine skier. Richardson Viano was the country's flagbearer during the opening and closing ceremonies.

Competitors
The following is the list of number of competitors at the Games per sport/discipline.

Alpine skiing

Haiti qualified one male alpine skier. Richardson Viano met the basic qualification standards and was named to the team. Viano was adopted by his parents who were from the French Alps at the age of three. Viano competed in the men's giant slalom but failed to complete the event.

See also
Haiti at the 2020 Winter Youth Olympics
Tropical nations at the Winter Olympics

References

Nations at the 2022 Winter Olympics
2022
Winter Olympics